{{Motorsport venue
| Name          = Autódromo Hermanos Emiliozzi
| Former_names  = Autódromo Sudamericano de Olavarría (1998–2008)
| Location      = Olavarría, Buenos Aires, Argentina
| Time          = UTC-03:00
| Opened        = 1998
| Coordinates   = 
| Image         = 
| Events        = Former:Top Race V6 (2001, 2003–2005, 2007, 2011–2012, 2015, 2019, 2021–2022)Turismo Carretera (1998–2006, 2008–2018)Turismo Nacional (1998, 2000–2001, 2003, 2005–2006, 2009, 2014, 2016)TC2000 (1998–1999, 2005–2006)SASTC (1998–2000)
| Layout1       = Full Circuit (1998–present)
| Length_km     = 5.079
| Length_mi     = 3.156
| Turns         = 9
| Record_time   = 1:52.423
| Record_driver =  Omar Martínez
| Record_car    = Honda Civic VI
| Record_year   = 1998
| Record_class  = TC2000
| Layout2       = Turismo Carretera Circuit (1998–present)
| Length_km2    = 4.117
| Length_mi2    = 2.550
| Turns2        = 6
| Record_time2  = 1:20.456
| Record_driver2=  Mathías Nolesi
| Record_car2   = Ford Falcon
| Record_year2  = 2015
| Record_class2 = Turismo Carretera
| Layout3       = Turismo Nacional Circuit (2014–present)
| Length_km3    = 4.313
| Length_mi3    = 2.670
| Turns3        = 9
| Record_time3  =
| Record_driver3=
| Record_car3   =
| Record_year3  =
| Record_class3 =
| Layout4       = No.5 Circuit (1998–present)
| Length_km4    = 3.679
| Length_mi4    = 2.280
| Turns4        = 7
| Record_time4  = 1:25.933
| Record_driver4=  Marcelo Bugliotti
| Record_car4   = Honda Civic VI
| Record_year4  = 1999
| Record_class4 = TC2000 || ''' || Marcelo Bugliotti ||  ||  Olavarría TC2000 round]]
}}Autódromo Hermanos Emiliozzi''' (formerly known as Autódromo Sudamericano de Olavarría until 2008) is a  motor sports circuit located near Olavarría, Argentina. The circuit was opened in 1998 and is notable for its minimal elevation change (being constructed on a flat, grassy plain) and its very long (~1 km) main straight.

Gallery

Lap records 

The official race lap records at the Autódromo Hermanos Emiliozzi are listed as:

References

Motorsport venues in Buenos Aires Province